The following lists the top 25 singles of 2002  in Australia from the Australian Recording Industry Association (ARIA) End of Year singles chart.

"Without Me" by Eminem was the biggest song of the year, peaking at #1 for five weeks and staying in the top 50 for 17 weeks. The longest stay at #1 was joint by Shakira with "Whenever, Wherever" which spent 6 weeks at the top spot, and it was joint by Avril Lavigne's "Complicated".

Notes

References

Australian record charts
2002 in Australian music
2002 record charts